Niamnova Lock, Niemnowo Lock - is the eighteenth lock on the Augustów Canal (from the Biebrza River), built between 1828 - 1830 by John Paul Lelewel. This is the third lock located on the territory of Belarus and also the last before the merger of the canalized Nieman River. Originally it was three-chamber lock, but during the reconstruction carried out in 2004 - 2006, the fourth compartment was added because of the changes that have occurred in between the river and its flow conditions. It is the largest lock the Augustów Canal.

 Location: 101.2 km canal
 Level difference: 9.80 m
 Length of chamber: 43.5 m
 Width: 5.90 m
 Gates: Wooden
 Year: 1828 - 1830, rebuilt 2004-2006
 Construction Manager: John Paul Lelewel

References

 
 
 

19th-century establishments in Belarus
Locks of Belarus